Joshua Akinola Ogunfaolu-Kayode (born 4 May 2000) is a professional footballer who plays as a forward for EFL League One club Milton Keynes Dons, on loan from EFL Championship club Rotherham United. 

Born in Nigeria, Kayode represents Ireland internationally.

Club career

Rotherham United
Kayode was born in Lagos, Nigeria, however, he grew up in Dublin, Ireland before moving to start his career in the youth team of Rotherham United. He made his professional debut in August 2017 in the EFL Trophy defeat to Manchester City U21. On 20 November 2017 he signed his first professional contract, a deal until the summer of 2020. On 19 September 2018, he joined National League side Chesterfield on a one-month youth loan. In early August 2019 he joined National League North side Gateshead on loan until January 2020, with conditions attached that meant he could still feature for Rotherham in the EFL Trophy. After returning from Gateshead, Kayode signed a new 2 and-a-half year deal extending his stay at Rotherham United until the summer of 2022. He then moved on loan to League Two side Carlisle United for the remainder of the 2019–20 season. This loan was formally extended in May 2020 to cover any potential extension to the season due to the COVID-19 pandemic.

On 4 August 2020, Kayode returned to Carlisle United, on a one-year loan. In April 2021 whilst on loan at Carlisle, Kayode signed a new contract with the Millers that would keep him at the club until the end of the 2023–24 season. He scored his first goal for Rotherham in an EFL Trophy tie against Crewe Alexandra on 4 January 2022.

In pre-season ahead of the 2022/23 campaign, Kayode would sustain a hamstring injury minutes after scoring the equaliser for Rotherham United in a friendly against Mansfield Town. After recovery, and in the need for game time, Kayode left Rotherham United on loan - signing for MK Dons on the 29th of August 2022. He would debut for MK Dons the following day as MK Dons suffered a 1-2 defeat to Cheltenham Town in the EFL Trophy. On the 3rd of September Kayode would make his League bow for the Dons, starting on the bench in a 1-0 loss away to Exeter City, his second League appearance coming versus Bolton Wanderers.

International career
Kayode was called up the Republic of Ireland under-21 team for the first time in October 2020, for the European Championship qualifier against Italy. He was called up for a second time in November 2020, making his debut from the bench against Iceland under-21 on 15 November 2020. He made his full debut and scored his first under-21 international goal on 18 November 2020, against Luxembourg under-21 in Luxembourg City.

Career statistics

Honours
Rotherham United
League One runner-up: 2021–22
EFL Trophy: 2021–22

References

External links
 

2000 births
Living people
Sportspeople from Lagos
Association football forwards
Republic of Ireland association footballers
Republic of Ireland youth international footballers
Nigerian footballers
Nigerian emigrants to Ireland
Irish people of Nigerian descent
Irish sportspeople of African descent
Rotherham United F.C. players
Milton Keynes Dons F.C. players
Chesterfield F.C. players
Gateshead F.C. players
Carlisle United F.C. players
National League (English football) players
English Football League players
Irish expatriate sportspeople in England
Nigerian expatriate footballers
Nigerian expatriates in England
Expatriate footballers in England
Republic of Ireland under-21 international footballers
Black Irish sportspeople